Stuff the Magic Dragon is the official mascot of the Orlando Magic of the National Basketball Association (NBA). His name is a play on the Peter, Paul and Mary song "Puff, the Magic Dragon", and the basketball slang term "stuff" (which means to either slam dunk or reject a slam dunk shot).

Biography
Stuff the Magic Dragon, described as "the tallest dragon in Orlando's history," was introduced in a giant egg on Church Street in 1989, where Dave Raymond, the original Phillie Phanatic, portrayed him for his "birth". He was "originally the Magic's #1 pick in the supplemental dragon back draft, directly out of clown college." Stuff is said to live in the Dragon's Lair at Orlando's Amway Center and has his own play area, "Stuff's Magic Castle" on the promenade level. Many think that Stuff is a copy of the Philly Phanatic, but the two mascots were made by the same company, Acme Mascots (Harrison/Erickson), which made many popular mascots including the retired Yankees mascot "Dandy", the Hornets mascot Hugo, and Montreal's Youppi!. According to original Magic general manager Pat Williams, various other mascot ideas were thrown before the dragon, including a rabbit, a wizard and a magic bean.

Appearance
Stuff is a neon green dragon with a blue uni-brow, two teeth on his muzzle, two antennae with stars on his head, a blue and pink mane that goes from his head to his tail, black shoes with star decorations, and pink wings on the sides of his head and on his arms. Stuff also has yellow party blowers that inflate and deflate that come out of his muzzle that represent "fire" that comes out of dragons' nostrils. He is recognizable with his white Magic jersey with his logo on the front, but also has jerseys that come in black and blue. During the 2010 playoffs, Stuff appeared with royal blue fur instead of his trademark neon green fur.

Antics
Stuff comes out on the court pre-game to do a skit and toss out T-shirts; during the game, he often ventures around in the stand and does more skits during breaks and between quarters. Most skits can be from a trampoline dunk show (by himself or with the Orlando Magic Flight Crew), a pump-up session with giant signs, break-dancing in the middle of the court, or dancing to a song compilation. A special song made for the mascot plays during his entrances. He also makes grand entrances during special events like the playoffs or opening night where he comes down from the rafters on a zip line or bungee. He also has two air-mascot counterparts, Air Stuff and Air Stuff Jr., and has a miniature mascot of him named Mini-Stuff. He gained nationwide popularity when he was featured on "The Tonight Show", hosted by Jimmy Fallon, during a dance off with their mascot, Hashtag the panda, during a week-long special in Orlando. He also made headlines when he proposed to Kate Upton.

Stuff is also the host of the annual "Celebrity Mascot Games" that takes place each year at the Amway Center. Each year, mascots from North America come to Orlando and compete in Olympic-style games while being in different colored teams. The Mascot Games were made for the non-profit organization, "New Hope For Kids", to raise money and attention for them. The games started in 1992 at the old Amway Arena and have continued annually ever since, with exceptions in 2013 (the games took a hiatus due to lack of a new partnership for the company), 2020, 2021 and 2022 (due to the COVID-19 pandemic) In 2023, New Hope For Kids announce the retirement of the event.

During his career, Stuff has been seen with many other sports mascots at numerous mascot-oriented events. Each year, about 4-5 mascots (locally and across the country) come to Orlando and do opportunities for pictures and meet and greets pre-game and during the game. Stuff and his mascot guests also do special skits, which normally include a mascot dunk show, a halftime skit, and a short number from the mascots' air counterparts. .

Stuff has recently received more popularity after the NBA All Star Game's Verizon Slam Dunk Contest, where he assisted Magic player Aaron Gordon during the event. He won the NBA Mascot Conference's Mascot of the Year award in 2016.

Awards
Mascot of the Year – 2016, 2017

References

External links
Stuff's Lair
Magic Blog: Stuff Happens

National Basketball Association mascots
Orlando Magic
Dragon mascots